The Violin Concerto is a composition for solo violin and orchestra by the American composer Joan Tower.  It was commissioned by the Barlow Endowment for Music Composition and the Snowbird Institute.  The piece was first performed by the violinist Elmar Oliveira and the Utah Symphony under the conductor Joseph Silverstein on April 24, 1992, in Salt Lake City, Utah.  It is dedicated to the violinist Elmar Oliveira.  The composition was a finalist for the 1993 Pulitzer Prize for Music.

Composition
The Violin Concerto has a duration of roughly 19 minutes and is composed in one continuous movement.  Tower described the composition in the score program notes, writing:

Instrumentation
The work is scored for solo violin and an orchestra comprising two flutes, two oboes, two clarinets, two bassoons, two horns, two trumpets, trombone, timpani, two percussionists, and strings.

Reception
The music critic Leslie Wright called the piece "well constructed and colorfully orchestrated."  He added, "I found the concerto convincing overall, though the violin's fast, repetitive solos became a bit tiresome after a while."

References

Concertos by Joan Tower
1991 compositions
Tower